William Marion Wilson (born October 4, 1958) is the president of Oral Roberts University in Tulsa, Oklahoma. Prior to serving as president of Oral Roberts University, Wilson was the vice chairman for its Board of Trustees. Wilson has also served as the executive director for the International Center for Spiritual Renewal in Cleveland, Tennessee and the chair and executive director of the Empowered 21 Initiative. In addition, he has served on boards and committees for Mission America Coalition (Lausanne USA) Facilitation Committee, the Pentecostal World Fellowship advisory board, and the International Christian Embassy Jerusalem.

Early life 
Wilson was born in Owensboro, Kentucky and attended Daviess County High School. Upon graduation from high school, Wilson attended Western Kentucky University in Bowling Green, Kentucky, where he earned a bachelor's degree in secondary education. Wilson also attended the Pentecostal Theological Seminary in Cleveland, Tennessee, where he earned his Master of Arts and Doctor of Ministry degrees.

Career

Early work 
Wilson forged national ecumenical coalitions with more than 250 denominations and parachurch ministries. In 2006, Wilson served as the executive officer for the Azusa Street Centennial in Los Angeles, California. This revival drew more than 50,000 people from 106 nations.

President of Oral Roberts University 
Wilson joined the Oral Roberts University board of trustees in 2008. After a vast search that included more than 170 presidential prospects, Wilson was announced as the fourth president of Oral Roberts University on January 31, 2013. He began his term on June 1, 2013.

Publications 
Wilson has written several books: 
Father Cry; According to WorldCat, the book is in six libraries.
Fasting Forward: Advancing Your Spiritual Life Through Fasting; According to WorldCat, the book is in four libraries.

References

External links 
Profile on ORU.edu
World Impact homepage
Empowered21 Conversation Participants
International Center for Spiritual Renewal Profile

1958 births
Living people
Western Kentucky University alumni
Presidents of Oral Roberts University
People from Owensboro, Kentucky